Robert Griffith Houston (October 13, 1867 – January 29, 1946) was an American lawyer, publisher and politician from Georgetown, in Sussex County, Delaware. He was a member of the Republican Party, who served four terms as U.S. Representative from Delaware. "Houston" is pronounced "house-ton," unlike the city in Texas with the same spelling.

Early life and family
Houston was born in Milton, Delaware. He attended public schools in Lewes, Delaware, and was the nephew of John W. Houston, who had served as U.S. Representative from Delaware between 1845 and 1851. He married Margaret White in 1888, an active suffragette and prohibition list.

Professional career
That same year, 1888, Houston was admitted to the Delaware Bar and began the practice of law in Georgetown. He served in the Delaware National Guard from 1890 to 1895 and in 1893, started "The Sussex Republican" a Sussex County newspaper. He was its owner and publisher until 1934. The paper continued under the name "The Sussex Countian" until 1946. Houston also served as the President of the First National Bank of Georgetown from 1901 to 1903.

Political career
In 1900, President William McKinley appointed Houston collector of customs for the district of Delaware, a post he held until 1904. He also served as Assistant Attorney General of Delaware from 1920 to 1924.

In 1924, popular Republican President Calvin Coolidge was reelected and led his party to a gain of 24 seats in the House of Representatives. Houston was elected to this U.S. House in 1924, defeating incumbent Democratic U.S. Representative William H. Boyce. He won election four times in all, also defeating Democrats Merrill H. Tilghman in 1926, John M. Richardson in 1928, and John P. LeFevre in 1930.

During these four terms, he served in the Republican majority in the 69th, 70th, and 71st Congress, but was in the minority in the 72nd Congress. He did not seek reelection in 1932, at the height of the Great Depression. In all, Houston served from March 4, 1925 until March 3, 1933, during the administrations of U.S. Presidents Calvin Coolidge and Herbert Hoover.

After leaving the U.S. House, Houston again served as Assistant Attorney General of Delaware from 1933 to 1935. In 1936, Houston ran for the U.S. Senate as an Independent-Republican. He finished third behind the incumbent Republican Daniel O. Hastings, and the successful candidate, Democratic James H. Hughes. Following this he retired from politics and resumed his career as a publisher.

Death and legacy
Houston died at Lewes, and is buried there in the Lewes Presbyterian Church cemetery, along with his uncle, former U.S. Representative John W. Houston.

Almanac
Elections are held the first Tuesday after November 1. U.S. Representatives took office March 4 and have a two-year term.

References

External links
Biographical Directory of the United States Congress
Delaware's Members of Congress
The Political Graveyard

Margaret White Houston 

1867 births
1946 deaths
American Presbyterians
People from Georgetown, Delaware
Delaware lawyers
Republican Party members of the Delaware House of Representatives
Burials in Sussex County, Delaware
Republican Party members of the United States House of Representatives from Delaware
People from Milton, Delaware